ADB-HEXINACA (also known as ADB-HINACA and ADMB-HEXINACA) is a cannabinoid designer drug that has been found as an ingredient in some synthetic cannabis products, first appearing in early 2021. It is a longer chain homologue of previously encountered synthetic cannabinoid compounds such as ADB-BUTINACA and ADB-PINACA.

See also 
 4F-ADB
 5F-ADB-PINACA
 ADB-CHMINACA
 ADB-FUBINACA
 ADB-4en-PINACA
 JWH-019

References 

Cannabinoids
Designer drugs

Indazolecarboxamides
Tert-butyl compounds